AndEngine is a game development engine for Android written in Java programming language by Nicolas Gramlich. The engine uses OpenGL ES technology to provide accelerated graphics output. It's possible to use Eclipse or Android Studio to ease development.

Architecture
AndEngine operates with engines which can provide different functionality. For example, FPSLogger engine can log FPS. Every engine has Scene which holds sprites and effects such as particle system emitters.

Features list
AndEngine supports output using custom shaders. Box2D extension provides physics calculations.

References

External links 

Video game development software